Avef Beridze (11 January 1955 – 12 November 2020) was a Georgian politician. He was a chairman of the Supreme Council of the Autonomous Republic of Adjara from 28 October 2012 to 28 November 2016.

Beridze is a native of Batumi. Formerly a member of the Republican Party of Georgia, he co-founded the public movement Serve to Georgia, in 2011, together with Murman Dumbadze, who had been dismissed from the Republican Party for his opposition to a planned Turkish-Georgian deal on rebuilding of an Ottoman-era mosque in Batumi. Both Dumbadze and Beridze then joined the Georgian Dream party founded by the tycoon Bidzina Ivanishvili to challenge Mikheil Saakashvili's United National Movement in the October 2012 parliamentary election. After the Georgian Dream's victory in both nationwide and regional legislative elections in his native Adjara, an autonomous entity on Georgia's Black Sea coast, Beridze was elected the chairman of the Supreme Council of Adjara, being the only candidate nominated for that position on 28 October 2012. His tenure expired in November 2016. Beridze then served in the administration of Adjara's government and the directorate of environmental protection of Adjara.

References 

1955 births
2020 deaths
People from Batumi
Politicians from Georgia (country)